Andhra Pradesh Capital Region is the metropolitan region area of Andhra Pradesh state capital, the defacto capital city of Andhra Pradesh. Vijayawada is the headquarters and the largest city of the region. It includes the major ancient cities of Vijayawada, Guntur, and Tenali. Andhra Pradesh Capital Region is one of the largest populated urban areas in the world, with its suburbs Vijayawada, Guntur, and Tenali being the 3rd, 24th, 41st most densely populated cities in the world. Vijayawada is the most densely populated city in India while Guntur is 11th and Tenali is the most populous city of 14th place in Andhra Pradesh. Andhra Pradesh Capital Region is the most populated metropolitan area in the state of Andhra Pradesh and 8th in India. Entire region is under the jurisdiction of Andhra Pradesh Capital Region Development Authority, and covers an area of  under 58 mandals, of which 29 are in Krishna district and 29 in Guntur district. The capital region covers 18 mandals fully and 11 mandals partially in Guntur district. In Krishna district, it covers 15 mandals fully and 14 mandals partially under the jurisdiction of APCRDA. The capital city is an Urban Notified Area, and will cover , within the Andhra Pradesh Capital Region. As of 1 August 2020, Andhra Pradesh proposed three capitals, which are Visakhapatnam as the executive capital, Amaravati as the legislative capital, and Kurnool as the judicial capital, but the process was cancelled and reverted back to the original 2014 plan of a singular capital city at Amaravati on 22 November 2021.

Administration

Urban local bodies 
The region has a total of 13 urban areas including the capital city of Amaravati, 3 municipal corporations, 10 municipalities. Vijayawada, Guntur, Tenali are the three municipal corporations, Gudivada, Jaggayyapeta, Mangalagiri, Nuzvid, Ponnur, Sattenapalle, Tadepalle, Nandigama, Vuyyuru and Tadigadapa are the municipalities.

Jurisdiction 

The below is the list of mandals and villages under the jurisdiction of Andhra Pradesh Capital Region Development Authority.

Partially included mandals/villages

The limits of the region was expanded on 22 September 2015, which resulted in addition and removal of the mandals and villages.

Mandals in the below list are the partially included (only some villages) in the capital region.

Guntur district

Krishna district

Zones in Capital Region 
Andhra Pradesh Capital Region is divided into eight zones.

Municipal Corporations 

• Vijayawada Municipal Corporation

• Guntur Municipal Corporation

•  Mangalagiri Tadepalli Municipal Corporation

Municipalities 
• Tadigadapa

• Kondapalli

• Tenali

Census Towns and other Neighbourhoods

See also 
Andhra Pradesh Capital Region Development Authority

References 

 
Geography of Andhra Pradesh
Metropolitan areas of India
Geography of Guntur district
Geography of Krishna district
Proposed infrastructure in Andhra Pradesh